The Sangerfield River flows into the Chenango River by Earlville, New York.

References

Rivers of Chenango County, New York
Rivers of Madison County, New York
Rivers of New York (state)